

Events

Pre-1600
 455 – Emperor Avitus enters Rome with a Gallic army and consolidates his power.
1170 – The Kingdom of Dublin falls to Norman invaders.
1217 – Livonian Crusade: The Estonian leader Lembitu and Livonian leader Kaupo the Accursed are killed in the Battle of St. Matthew's Day.
1435 – The Congress of Arras causes Burgundy to switch sides in the Hundred Years' War.

1601–1900
1745 – A Hanoverian army is defeated, in ten minutes, by the Jacobite forces of Prince Charles Edward Stuart
1776 – Part of New York City is burned shortly after being occupied by British forces.
1780 – American Revolutionary War: Benedict Arnold gives the British the plans to West Point.
1792 – French Revolution: The National Convention abolishes the monarchy.
1809 – British Secretary of War Lord Castlereagh and Foreign Secretary George Canning meet in a duel on Putney Heath, with Castlereagh wounding Canning in the thigh.
1843 – The crew of schooner Ancud, including John Williams Wilson, takes possession of the Strait of Magellan on behalf of the Chilean government. 
1860 – Second Opium War: An Anglo-French force defeats Chinese troops at the Battle of Palikao.
1896 – Anglo-Egyptian conquest of Sudan: British forces under the command of Horatio Kitchener take Dongola.
1898 – Empress Dowager Cixi seizes power and ends the Hundred Days' Reform in China.

1901–present
1921 – A storage silo in Oppau, Germany, explodes, killing 500–600 people.
1933 – Salvador Lutteroth establishes Mexican professional wrestling.
1934 – A large typhoon hits western Honshū, Japan, killing more than 3,000 people.
1938 – The Great Hurricane of 1938 makes landfall on Long Island in New York. The death toll is estimated at 500–700 people.
1939 – Romanian Prime Minister Armand Călinescu is assassinated by the Iron Guard.
1942 – The Holocaust in Ukraine: On the Jewish holiday of Yom Kippur, Nazis send over 1,000 Jews of Pidhaitsi to Bełżec extermination camp.
  1942   – The Holocaust in Ukraine: In Dunaivtsi, Ukraine, Nazis murder 2,588 Jews.
  1942   – The Holocaust in Poland: At the end of Yom Kippur, Germans order Jews to permanently move from Konstantynów to Biała Podlaska.
  1942   – The Boeing B-29 Superfortress makes its maiden flight.
1953 – Lieutenant No Kum-sok, a North Korean pilot, defects to South Korea with his jet fighter.
1957 – Pamir, a four-masted barque, was shipwrecked and sank off the Azores during Hurricane Carrie.
1964 – Malta gains independence from the United Kingdom, but remains in the Commonwealth.
  1964   – The North American XB-70 Valkyrie, the world's fastest bomber, makes its maiden flight from Palmdale, California.
1965 – The Gambia, Maldives and Singapore are admitted as members of the United Nations.
1971 – Bahrain, Bhutan and Qatar join the United Nations.
1972 – Philippine President Ferdinand Marcos begins authoritarian rule by declaring martial law.
1976 – Orlando Letelier is assassinated in Washington, D.C because had been a member of the former Chilean Marxist government.
  1976   – Seychelles joins the United Nations.
1981 – Belize is granted full independence from the United Kingdom.
  1981   – Sandra Day O'Connor is unanimously approved by the U.S. Senate as the first female Supreme Court justice.
1984 – Brunei joins the United Nations.
1991 – Armenia gains independence from the Soviet Union.
1993 – Russian President Boris Yeltsin triggers a constitutional crisis when he suspends parliament and scraps the constitution.
1996 – The Defense of Marriage Act is passed by the United States Congress.
1997 – St. Olaf's Church, a stone church from the 16th century in Tyrvää, Finland, was burnt down by a burglar.
1999 – The Chi-Chi earthquake occurs in central Taiwan, leaving about 2,400 people dead.
2001 – America: A Tribute to Heroes is broadcast by over 35 network and cable channels, raising over $200 million for the victims of the September 11 attacks.
  2001   – Ross Parker is murdered in Peterborough, England, by a gang of ten British Pakistani youths.
2003 – The Galileo spacecraft is terminated by sending it into Jupiter's atmosphere.
2012 – Three Egyptian militants open fire on a group of Israeli soldiers in a southern Israel cross-border attack.
2013 – Al-Shabaab Islamic militants attack the Westgate shopping mall in Kenya, killing at least 67 people.
2018 – Killing of Zak Kostopoulos, LGBT rights activist beaten to death on a busy street in Athens
2019 – A 5.6 Mw earthquake shakes the Albanian port of Durrës.  Forty-nine people are injured in the capital, Tirana.

Births

Pre-1600
 580 – Pope Vitalian (d. 672)
 953 – Abu Ishaq Ibrahim, Buyid prince
1051 – Bertha of Savoy (d. 1087)
1371 – Frederick I, Elector of Brandenburg (d. 1440)
1407 – Leonello d'Este, Marquis of Ferrara, Italian noble (d. 1450)
1411 – Richard of York, 3rd Duke of York, English politician, Lord Protector of England (d. 1460)
1415 – Frederick III, Holy Roman Emperor (d. 1493)
1428 – Jingtai Emperor of China (d. 1457)
1433 – Guillaume Fichet, French scholar and academic (d. 1480)
1452 – Girolamo Savonarola, Italian priest and philosopher (d. 1498)
1457 – Hedwig Jagiellon, Duchess of Bavaria, Polish princess (d. 1502)
1552 – Barbara Longhi, Italian painter (d. 1638)
1559 – Cigoli, Italian painter and architect (d. 1613)

1601–1900
1629 – Philip Howard, English cardinal (d. 1694)
1640 – Philippe I, Duke of Orléans, younger son of Louis XIII of France and his wife (d. 1701)
1645 – Louis Jolliet, Canadian explorer (d. 1700)
1706 – Polyxena of Hesse-Rotenburg (d. 1735)
1758 – Christopher Gore, American soldier, lawyer, and politician, 8th Governor of Massachusetts (d. 1827)
1760 – Ivan Dmitriev, Russian poet and politician, Minister of Justice for Imperial Russia (d. 1837)
1776 – John Fitchett, English poet (d. 1838)
1819 – Princess Louise Marie Thérèse of Artois (d. 1864)
1840 – Murad V, Ottoman sultan (d. 1904)
1842 – Abdul Hamid II, 34th Sultan of the Ottoman Empire (d. 1918)
1846 – Mihály Kolossa, Hungarian-Slovene author and poet (d. 1906)
1849 – Maurice Barrymore, American actor (d. 1905)
1851 – Fanny Searls, American biologist (d. 1939)
1853 – Heike Kamerlingh Onnes, Dutch physicist and academic, Nobel Prize laureate (d. 1926)
1859 – Francesc Macià, Catalan colonel and politician, 122nd President of Catalonia  (d. 1933)
1862 – James E. Talmage, English-American religious leader and author (d. 1933)
1863 – John Bunny, American actor (d. 1915)
1866 – Charles Nicolle, French-Tunisian microbiologist and academic, Nobel Prize laureate (d. 1936)
  1866   – H. G. Wells, English novelist, historian, and critic (d. 1946)
1867 – Charles Bathurst, 1st Viscount Bledisloe, English politician, 4th Governor-General of New Zealand (d. 1958)
  1867   – Henry L. Stimson, American colonel, lawyer, and politician, 46th United States Secretary of State (d. 1950)
1872 – Henry Tingle Wilde, English chief officer on the RMS Titanic (d. 1912)
1873 – Papa Jack Laine, American drummer and bandleader (d. 1966)
1874 – Gustav Holst, English composer and educator (d. 1934)
1878 – Peter McWilliam, Scottish-English footballer and manager (d. 1951)
1882 – Geevarghese Ivanios, Indian metropolitan (d. 1953)
1884 – Dénes Kőnig, Hungarian mathematician and theorist (d. 1944)
1890 – Max Immelmann, German lieutenant and pilot (d. 1916)
  1890   – Charles William Train, English sergeant, Victoria Cross recipient (d. 1965)
1893 – Erna Scheffler, German lawyer and justice of the Federal Constitutional Court (d. 1983)
1894 – Anton Piëch, Austrian lawyer and businessman (d. 1952)
1898 – Frances Mary Albrier, American civil rights activist (d. 1987)
1899 – Frederick Coutts, Scottish 8th General of The Salvation Army (d. 1986)

1901–present
1902 – Luis Cernuda, Spanish poet and critic (d. 1963)
  1902   – Allen Lane, English publisher, founded Penguin Books (d. 1970)
  1902   – Howie Morenz, Canadian ice hockey player (d. 1937)
1903 – Preston Tucker, American engineer and businessman, designed the Tucker Sedan (d. 1956)
1904 – Hans Hartung, German-French painter (d. 1989)
1905 – Robert Lebel, Canadian businessman and politician (d. 1999)
1906 – Henry Beachell, American biologist and botanist (d. 2006)
1909 – Kwame Nkrumah, Ghanaian educator and politician, 1st President of Ghana (d. 1972)
1910 – Meinrad Schütter, Swiss composer (d. 2006)
1912 – Chuck Jones, American animator, producer, and screenwriter (d. 2002)
  1912   – György Sándor, Hungarian pianist and composer (d. 2005)
1916 – Françoise Giroud, Swiss-French journalist and politician, French Minister of Culture (d. 2003)
1917 – Phyllis Nicolson, English mathematician and academic (d. 1968)
1918 – John Gofman, American physicist, chemist, and biologist (d. 2007)
  1918   – Karl Slover, American actor (d. 2011)
  1918   – Juan José Arreola, Mexican writer and academic (d. 2001)
1919 – Mario Bunge, Argentinian-Canadian physicist and philosopher (d. 2020)
  1919   – Herman Fowlkes, Jr., American trumpet player and educator (d. 1993)
  1919   – Fazlur Rahman Malik, Pakistani philosopher and scholar (d. 1988)
1920 – Kenneth McAlpine, British race car driver
1921 – John McHale, American baseball player and manager (d. 2008)
1923 – Fred Hunt, British jazz pianist (d. 1986)
1924 – Hermann Buhl, Austrian mountaineer (d. 1957)
1926 – Don Dunstan, Fijian-Australian lawyer and politician, 35th Premier of South Australia (d. 1999)
  1926   – Donald A. Glaser, American physicist and neurobiologist, Nobel Prize laureate (d. 2013)
  1926   – Fereydoon Moshiri, Iranian poet and critic (d. 2000)
1929 – Sándor Kocsis, Hungarian footballer and manager (d. 1979)
  1929   – Edgar Valter, Estonian author and illustrator (d. 2006)
  1929   – Bernard Williams, English-Italian philosopher and academic (d. 2003)
1930 – John Morgan, Welsh-Canadian actor and screenwriter (d. 2004)
  1930   – Bob Stokoe, English footballer and manager (d. 2004)
1931 – Larry Hagman, American actor, director, and producer (d. 2012)
1932 – Shirley Conran, English journalist and author
  1932   – Marjorie Fletcher, English Director of the Women's Royal Naval Service (d. 2008)
  1932   – Don Preston, American keyboard player and composer 
1933 – Allan Jeans, Australian footballer and coach (d. 2011)
  1933   – Dick Simon, American race car driver
1934 – Leonard Cohen, Canadian singer-songwriter and poet (d. 2016)
  1934   – María Rubio, Mexican actress (d. 2018)
1935 – Jimmy Armfield, English footballer and manager (d. 2018)
  1935   – Henry Gibson, American actor (d. 2009)
1936 – Ian Albery, English manager and producer
  1936   – Dickey Lee, American pop-country singer-songwriter and guitarist
  1936   – Yury Luzhkov, Russian soldier and politician, 2nd Mayor of Moscow (d. 2019)
  1936   – Diane Rehm, American journalist and radio host
1937 – John D'Amico, Canadian ice hockey player and referee (d. 2005)
1938 – Doug Moe, American basketball player and coach
  1938   – Olu Falae, Nigerian politician and government official
1939 – Agnivesh, Indian philosopher, academic, and politician 
1940 – Ron Fenton, English footballer, coach, and manager (d. 2013)
  1940   – Hermann Knoflacher, Austrian engineer and academic
  1940   – Bill Kurtis, American journalist and producer
1941 – Jack Brisco, American wrestler and manager (d. 2010)
  1941   – R. James Woolsey, Jr., American scholar and diplomat, 16th Director of Central Intelligence
1942 – Sam McDowell, American baseball player
1943 – David Hood, American session bassist and trombone player
  1943   – Jerry Bruckheimer, American film and television producer 
1944 – Steve Beshear, American lawyer and politician, 61st Governor of Kentucky
  1944   – Marcus Binney, English historian and author
  1944   – Fannie Flagg, American actress, comedian, and author
  1944   – Hamilton Jordan, American politician, 8th White House Chief of Staff (d. 2008)
  1944   – Bobby Tench, English singer-songwriter and guitarist 
1945 – Richard Childress, American race car driver and businessman
  1945   – Shaw Clifton, Northern Irish 18th General of The Salvation Army
  1945   – Kay Ryan, American poet and educator
1946 – Rose Garrard, English sculptor and author
  1946   – Moritz Leuenberger, Swiss lawyer and politician, 87th President of the Swiss Confederation
  1946   – Mart Siimann, Estonian psychologist and politician, 12th Prime Minister of Estonia
1947 – Don Felder, American musician and songwriter
  1947   – Keith Harris, English ventriloquist and singer (d. 2015)
  1947   – Rupert Hine, English musician, songwriter, and record producer (d. 2020)
  1947   – Stephen King, American author and screenwriter
  1947   – Ed Nimmervoll, Austrian-Australian journalist, historian, and author (d. 2014)
  1947   – Marsha Norman, American playwright and author
1948 – Jack Dromey, English union leader and politician
  1948   – Mitsuo Momota, Japanese wrestler
1949 – Henry Butler, American pianist and photographer (d. 2018)
  1949   – Artis Gilmore, American basketball player and radio host
  1949   – Odilo Scherer, Brazilian cardinal
1950 – Charles Clarke, English economist and politician, Secretary of State for Education
  1950   – Bill Murray, American actor, comedian, producer, and screenwriter
1951 – Bruce Arena, American soccer player and manager
  1951   – Aslan Maskhadov, Chechen general and politician, 3rd President of the Chechen Republic of Ichkeria (d. 2005)
1952 – Dave Gregory, English guitarist and keyboard player 
  1952   – John Taylor, Baron Taylor of Warwick, English lawyer and politician
1953 – Arie Luyendyk, Dutch race car driver and sportscaster
  1953   – Reinhard Marx, German cardinal
1954 – Shinzo Abe, Japanese lawyer and politician, 90th Prime Minister of Japan (d. 2022)
  1954   – Thomas S. Ray, American ecologist and academic
  1954   – Phil "Philthy Animal" Taylor, English rock drummer (d. 2015) 
1955 – Richard Hieb, American engineer and astronaut
  1955   – Israel Katz, Israeli politician
  1955   – Mika Kaurismäki, Finnish director, producer, and screenwriter
1956 – Jack Givens, American basketball player and sportscaster
  1956   – Marta Kauffman, American screenwriter and producer
  1956   – Ricky Morton, American wrestler
1957 – Ethan Coen, American director, producer, and screenwriter
  1957   – Mark Levin, American lawyer, radio host, and author
  1957   – Sidney Moncrief, American basketball player and coach
  1957   – Kevin Rudd, Australian politician and diplomat, 26th Prime Minister of Australia
1958 – Rick Mahorn, American basketball player and coach
  1958   – Simon Mayo, English radio host
1959 – Crin Antonescu, Romanian educator and politician, former Interim President of Romania
  1959   – Andrzej Buncol, Polish footballer
  1959   – Dave Coulier, American actor, comedian, producer, and screenwriter
  1959   – Danny Cox, English-American baseball player and coach
  1959   – Corinne Drewery, English singer-songwriter and fashion designer
1960 – David James Elliott, Canadian-American actor and director
  1960   – Masoumeh Ebtekar, Iranian journalist, politician and scientist, first woman Vice President of Iran
  1960   – Kelley Eskridge, American author and screenwriter
  1960   – Musalia Mudavadi, Kenyan politician and Former Deputy Prime Minister
  1960   – Graham Southern, English art dealer and gallery owner
  1960   – Maurizio Cattelan, Italian sculptor
1961 – Billy Collins, Jr., American boxer (d. 1984)
  1961   – Dan Borislow, American businessman and inventor (d. 2014)
  1961   – Nancy Travis, American actress and producer
1962 – Rob Morrow, American actor
1963 – Curtly Ambrose, Antiguan cricketer and bass player
  1963   – Cecil Fielder, American baseball player and manager
  1963   – Angus Macfadyen, Scottish actor and screenwriter
  1963   – Mamoru Samuragochi, Japanese composer
  1963   – Trevor Steven, English footballer
  1963   – David J. Wales, British academic and educator
1964 – Jorge Drexler, Uruguayan singer-songwriter 
  1964   – Lester Quitzau, Canadian guitarist
1965 – Frédéric Beigbeder, French author and critic
  1965   – Cheryl Hines, American actress
  1965   – Johanna Vuoksenmaa, Finnish director and screenwriter
1966 – Kerrin Lee-Gartner, Canadian skier and journalist
1967 – Faith Hill, American singer-songwriter, producer, and actress
  1967   – Suman Pokhrel, Nepali poet, lyricist and playwright
  1967   – Tyler Stewart, Canadian drummer 
1968 – Kevin Buzzard, British mathematician
  1968   – David Jude Jolicoeur, American rapper, songwriter, and producer (d. 2023)
  1968   – Ricki Lake, American actress, producer, and talk show host
1969 – Anne Burrell, American chef and television host
  1969   – Jason Christiansen, American baseball player
  1969   – Curtis Leschyshyn, Canadian ice hockey player and sportscaster
1970 – Melissa Ferrick, American singer-songwriter and guitarist
  1970   – Samantha Power, Irish-American journalist, academic, and diplomat, 28th United States Ambassador to the United Nations
1971 – John Crawley, English cricketer and academic
  1971   – Alfonso Ribeiro, American actor, director, and comedian
  1971   – Luke Wilson, American actor, director, and screenwriter
1972 – Olivia Bonamy, French actress
  1972   – Liam Gallagher, English singer-songwriter 
  1972   – Jon Kitna, American football player and coach
1973 – Vanessa Grigoriadis, American journalist and author
  1973   – Virginia Ruano Pascual, Spanish tennis player
  1973   – Oswaldo Sánchez, Mexican footballer
1974 – Bryce Drew, American basketball player and coach
  1974   – Andy Todd, English footballer and manager
1975 – Doug Davis, American baseball player
1976 – Jonas Bjerre, Danish singer-songwriter and guitarist 
  1976   – Poul Hübertz, Danish footballer and manager
1977 – Kārlis Lācis, Latvian pianist and composer 
  1977   – Andre Pärn, Estonian basketball player
  1977   – Kohei Sato, Japanese wrestler
  1977   – Brian Tallet, American baseball player
1978 – Paulo Costanzo, Canadian actor, director, and producer
  1978   – Luke Godden, Australian footballer
  1978   – Doug Howlett, New Zealand rugby player
1979 – James Allan, Scottish singer-songwriter and guitarist 
  1979   – Richard Dunne, Irish footballer
  1979   – Chris Gayle, Jamaican cricketer
  1979   – Julian Gray, English footballer
  1979   – Monika Merl, German runner
1980 – Nyree Kindred, Welsh swimmer
  1980   – Tomas Scheckter, South African race car driver
  1980   – Autumn Reeser, American actress
  1980   – Kareena Kapoor,  Indian actress        
1981 – Nicole Richie, American actress, fashion designer, and author
  1981   – Sarah Whatmore, English singer-songwriter
1982 – Eduardo Azevedo, Brazilian race car driver
  1982   – Dominic Perrottet, Australian politician, 46th Premier of New South Wales
  1982   – Christos Tapoutos, Greek basketball player
  1982   – Rowan Vine, English footballer
1983 – Ndiss Kaba Badji, Senegalese athlete
  1983   – Alex Bailey, British footballer
  1983   – Dwayne Barker, English rugby league player
  1983   – Sarah Rees Brennan, Irish writer
  1983   – Stipe Buljan, Croatian footballer
  1983   – John Castillo, Colombian footballer
  1983   – Fernando Cavenaghi, Argentine footballer
  1983   – Wagner Diniz, Brazilian footballer
  1983   – Moustapha Djallit, Algerian footballer
  1983   – Francesco Dracone, Italian race car driver
  1983   – Scott Evans, American actor
  1983   – Anna Favella, Italian actress
  1983   – Éder Monteiro Fernandes, Brazilian footballer
  1983   – Kristian Gidlund, Swedish drummer and journalist  (d. 2013)
  1983   – Maggie Grace, American actress
  1983   – Bryan Willis Hamilton, American musician
  1983   – Liam Harrison, British rugby league player
  1983   – Cristian Hidalgo, Spanish footballer
  1983   – Greg Jennings, American football player
  1983   – Dorothea Kalpakidou, Greek discus thrower
  1983   – Derek Landri, American footballer
  1983   – C. S. Magaoay, American researcher and activist
  1983   – Joseph Mazzello, American actor, director, producer, and screenwriter
  1983   – Anna Meares, Australian track cyclist
  1983   – Reggie Nelson, American footballer
  1983   – Dênis Oliveira de Souza, Brazilian footballer
  1983   – Rasmus Persson, Swedish radio personality
  1983   – Marcin Piekarski, Polish luger
  1983   – Rafael Marques Pinto, Brazilian footballer
  1983   – Tori Polk, American athlete
  1983   – Miguel Potes Mina, Colombian footballer
  1983   – Javier Alejandro Rabbia, Argentine footballer
  1983   – Wakakirin Shinichi, Japanese sumo wrestler and mixed martial artist
  1983   – Joana Solnado, Portuguese actress
  1983   – Ben Richardson, British cinematographer
  1983   – Asa Taccone, American musician
  1983   – Ronny Toma, Italian footballer
  1983   – Sanka Wijegunaratne, Sri Lankan cricketer
  1983   – Ycare, French singer songwriter
1984 – Ben Wildman-Tobriner, American swimmer
  1984   – Wale, American rapper
1985 – Justin Durant, American football player
1986 – Faris Badwan, English singer-songwriter 
  1986   – Lindsey Stirling, American violinist and composer
1987 – Jimmy Clausen, American football player
  1987   – Anthony Don, Australian rugby league player
  1987   – Marcelo Estigarribia, Paraguayan footballer
  1987   – Murilo Maccari, Brazilian footballer
  1987   – Ashley Paris, American basketball player
  1987   – Courtney Paris, American basketball player
  1987   – Michał Pazdan, Polish footballer
  1987   – Ivelisse Vélez, Puerto Rican wrestler 
1988 – Doug Baldwin, American football player
  1988   – Bilawal Bhutto Zardari, Pakistani politician
1989 – Jason Derulo, American singer-songwriter
  1989   – Sandor Earl, Australian rugby league player
  1989   – Emma Watkins, Australian singer and actress 
1990 – Al-Farouq Aminu, American basketball player
  1990   – Danny Batth, English footballer
  1990   – Rob Cross, English darts player
  1990   – Ivan Dorschner, American-Filipino model and actor
  1990   – Sam Kasiano, New Zealand rugby league player
1991 – Anastassia Kovalenko, Estonian motorcycle racer
1992 – Kim Jong-dae, South Korean singer-songwriter
  1992   – Rodrigo Godínez, Mexican footballer
  1992   – Devyn Marble, American basketball player
1993 – Kirsty Gilmour, Scottish badminton player
  1993   – Kwon Mina, South Korean singer and actress 
  1993   – Ante Rebić, Croatian footballer
1998 – Máscara de Bronce, Mexican wrestler
1999 – Wang Junkai, Chinese singer
  1999   – Alexander Isak, Eritrean-Swedish professional footballer

Deaths

Pre-1600
19 BC – Virgil, Roman poet (b. 70 BC)
 454 – Flavius Aetius, Roman general and politician (b. 396)
 687 – Pope Conon (b. 630)
1026 – Otto-William, Count of Burgundy
1217 – Lembitu, Estonian king and military leader
  1217   – Caupo of Turaida
1235 – Andrew II of Hungary (b. 1175)
1256 – William of Kilkenny, Lord Chancellor of England
1327 – Edward II of England (b. 1284)
1397 – Richard FitzAlan, 11th Earl of Arundel, English admiral (b. 1346)
1558 – Charles V, Holy Roman Emperor (b. 1500)
1576 – Gerolamo Cardano, Italian mathematician, physician, and astrologer (b. 1501)
1586 – Antoine Perrenot de Granvelle, French cardinal and diplomat (b. 1517)

1601–1900
1629 – Jan Pieterszoon Coen, Governor-General of the Dutch East Indies (b. 1587)
1637 – William V, Landgrave of Hesse-Kassel (b. 1602)
1643 – Emperor Hong Taiji of China (b. 1592)
1709 – Ivan Mazepa, Ukrainian statesman, Hetman of Zaporizhian Host (b. 1639)
1719 – Johann Heinrich Acker, German historian and academic (b. 1647)
1743 – Jai Singh II, Indian king (b. 1688)
1748 – John Balguy, English philosopher and author (b. 1686)
1796 – François Séverin Marceau-Desgraviers, French general (b. 1769)
1798 – George Read, American lawyer and politician, 3rd Governor of Delaware (b. 1733)
1812 – Emanuel Schikaneder, German actor and playwright (b. 1751)
1832 – Walter Scott, Scottish novelist, playwright, and poet (b. 1771)
1860 – Arthur Schopenhauer, German philosopher and author (b. 1788)
1874 – Jean-Baptiste Élie de Beaumont, French geologist and engineer (b. 1798)
1880 – Manuel Montt, Chilean scholar and politician, 6th President of Chile (b. 1809)

1901–present
1904 – Chief Joseph, American tribal leader (b. 1840)
1905 – Nikolay Benardos, Ukrainian inventor (b. 1842)
1906 – Samuel Arnold, American conspirator (b. 1838)
1926 – Léon Charles Thévenin, French engineer (b. 1857)
1933 – Kenji Miyazawa, Japanese author and poet (b. 1896)
1937 – Osgood Perkins, American actor (b. 1892)
1938 – Ivana Brlić-Mažuranić, Croatian author and poet (b. 1874)
1939 – Armand Călinescu, Romanian economist and politician, 39th Prime Minister of Romania (b. 1893)
1942 – John Symes, English cricketer (b. 1879)
1944 – Alexander Koshetz, Ukrainian choral conductor, arranger, composer (b. 1875)
  1944   – Artur Phleps, Romanian general (b. 1881)
1947 – Harry Carey, American actor, director, producer, and screenwriter (b. 1878)
1953 – Necmettin Sadak, Turkish publisher and politician, 10th Turkish Minister of Foreign Affairs (b. 1890)
1954 – Mikimoto Kōkichi, Japanese businessman (b. 1858)
1956 – Bill Struth, Scottish footballer and manager (b. 1875)
1957 – Haakon VII of Norway (b. 1872)
1958 – Peter Whitehead, English race car driver (b. 1914)
1961 – Ed Oliver, American golfer (b. 1915)
1962 – Bo Carter, American singer-songwriter and guitarist (b. 1892)
1963 – Paulino Masip, Spanish author, playwright, and screenwriter (b. 1899)
1964 – Josef Müller, Croatian entomologist (b. 1880)
1966 – Paul Reynaud, French lawyer and politician, 118th Prime Minister of France (b. 1878)
1971 – Bernardo Houssay, Argentinian physiologist and physician, Nobel Prize laureate (b. 1887)
1972 – Henry de Montherlant, French essayist, novelist, and dramatist (b. 1896)
1974 – Walter Brennan, American actor (b. 1894)
  1974   – Jacqueline Susann, American author and actress (b. 1918)
1975 – Bedri Rahmi Eyüboğlu, Turkish painter and poet (b. 1911)
1976 – Benjamin Graham, British-American economist, professor, and investor (b. 1894)
  1976   – Orlando Letelier, Chilean economist and politician, Minister of Foreign Affairs for Chile (b. 1932)
1982 – Ivan Bagramyan, Russian general (b. 1897)
1983 – Andrew Brewin, Canadian politician (b. 1907)
  1983   – Bob Donham, American basketball player (b. 1926)
  1983   – Bada Rajan, Indian mobster (b. unknown)
  1983   – Birgit Tengroth, Swedish actor (b. 1915)
  1983   – Willy Trenk-Trebitsch, Austrian actor (b. 1902)
  1983   – Xavier Zubiri, Basque philosopher (b. 1898)
1985 – Gu Long, Chinese author and screenwriter (b. 1937)
1987 – Jaco Pastorius, American bass player, composer, and producer (b. 1951)
1988 – Glenn Robert Davis, American lieutenant and politician (b. 1914)
1989 – Rajini Thiranagama, Sri Lankan physician and academic (b. 1954)
1990 – Takis Kanellopoulos, Greek director, producer, and screenwriter (b. 1933)
1991 – Gordon Bashford, English engineer (b. 1916)
1992 – Tarachand Barjatya, Indian film producer, founded Rajshri Productions (b. 1914)
1995 – Rudy Perpich, American dentist and politician, 34th Governor of Minnesota (b. 1928)
1998 – Florence Griffith Joyner, American sprinter (b. 1959)
2000 – Jacques Flynn, Canadian lawyer and politician, 35th Canadian Minister of Justice (b. 1915)
  2000   – Leonid Rogozov, Russian physician and surgeon (b. 1934)
2002 – Robert L. Forward, American physicist and science fiction author (b. 1932)
2004 – Bob Mason, English actor and screenwriter (b. 1952)
2006 – Tasos Athanasiadis, Greek author (b. 1913)
2007 – Hallgeir Brenden, Norwegian skier (b. 1929)
  2007   – Alice Ghostley, American actress (b. 1923)
  2007   – Rex Humbard, American evangelist and television host (b. 1919)
2009 – Robert Ginty, American actor, director, and screenwriter (b. 1948)
2011 – John Du Cann, English guitarist (b. 1946)
  2011   – Jun Henmi, Japanese author and poet (b. 1939)
  2011   – Pamela Ann Rymer, American lawyer and judge (b. 1941)
2012 – José Curbelo, Cuban-American pianist and manager (b. 1917)
  2012   – Yehuda Elkana, Israeli historian and philosopher (b. 1934)
  2012   – Sven Hassel, Danish-German soldier and author (b. 1917)
  2012   – Bill King, English commander, sailor, and author (b. 1910)
  2012   – Tom Umphlett, American baseball player and manager (b. 1930) 
2013 – Kofi Awoonor, Ghanaian author, poet, and diplomat (b. 1935)
  2013   – Michel Brault, Canadian director, producer, and screenwriter (b. 1928)
  2013   – Harl H. Haas, Jr., American lawyer, jurist, and politician (b. 1932)
  2013   – Walter Wallmann, German lawyer and politician, Minister-President of Hesse (b. 1932)
  2013   – Ko Wierenga, Dutch lawyer and politician (b. 1933)
2014 – Michael Harari, Israeli intelligence officer (b. 1927)
  2014   – Caldwell Jones, American basketball player and coach (b. 1950)
  2014   – Sheldon Patinkin, American director and playwright (b. 1935)
2015 – Yoram Gross, Polish-Australian director and producer (b. 1926)
  2015   – Ray Warleigh, Australian-English saxophonist and flute player (b. 1938)
  2015   – Richard Williamson, American footballer and coach (b. 1941)
2018 – Trần Đại Quang, President of Vietnam (b. 1956)
  2018   – Vitaliy Masol, Ukrainian Former Prime Minister (b.1928)
2020 – Arthur Ashkin, American scientist and Nobel laureate (b. 1922)
2021 – Willie Garson, American actor (b. 1964)
2022 – Raju Srivastav, Indian comedian, actor and politician (b. 1963)

Holidays and observances
Autumnal equinox observances in the Northern Hemisphere, vernal equinox observances in the Southern Hemisphere (see September 22):
Spring Day (Argentina)

Christian feast day:
Ephigenia of Ethiopia
Laurent-Joseph-Marius Imbert (one of the Korean Martyrs)
Matthew the Evangelist (Western Church)
Nativity of the Theotokos (Eastern Orthodox Church, Julian calendar)
September 21 (Eastern Orthodox liturgics)
Arbor Day (Brazil)
Commemoration of the Declaration of Martial Law (Philippines)
Customs Service Day (Poland) 
Founder's Day and National Volunteer Day (Ghana)
Independence Day, celebrates the independence of Armenia from the Soviet Union in 1991.
Independence Day, celebrates the independence of Belize from the United Kingdom in 1981.
Independence Day, celebrates the independence of Malta from the United Kingdom in 1964.
International Day of Peace (International)
Student's Day (Bolivia)
Victory over the Golden Horde in the Battle of Kulikovo (Russia)

Other 
 In the popular 1978 song "September" by Earth, Wind & Fire, the date is mentioned in the lyric "Do you remember the 21st night of September?" Reference to this date has gained popularity due to the song's spread as an internet meme.

References

External links

 
 
 

Days of the year
September